Esparto school district is a school district in Esparto, California. The district comprises Madison High School, Esparto High School, Esparto Middle School and Esparto Elementary School.

References

External links 

School districts in Yolo County, California